This list is of the Cultural Properties of Japan designated in the category of  for the Prefecture of Kagoshima.

National Cultural Properties
As of 1 July 2019, one Important Cultural Property has been designated, being of national significance.

Prefectural Cultural Properties
As of 14 August 2018, six properties have been designated at a prefectural level.

Municipal Cultural Properties
As of 14 August 2018, twenty-nine properties have been designated at a municipal level, including:

See also
 Cultural Properties of Japan
 List of National Treasures of Japan (paintings)
 Japanese painting
 List of Cultural Properties of Japan - historical materials (Kagoshima)
 List of Historic Sites of Japan (Kagoshima)
 List of Museums in Kagoshima Prefecture

References

External links
  Cultural Properties in Kagoshima Prefecture

Cultural Properties,Kagoshima
Cultural Properties,Paintings
Paintings,Kagoshima
Lists of paintings